Scott D. Haring is a game designer who has worked primarily on role-playing games.

Career
Scott Haring began working in the adventure gaming industry in 1982. Haring had a long career with Steve Jackson Games, having worked at the company five different times over a period of 15 years. Haring has worked as the Car Wars line editor, and became editor on the new magazine Autoduel Quarterly when it debuted in 1983. He also wrote and edited for Ghostbusters and GURPS and served as the editor for Pyramid magazine. He has been a columnist for Comics & Games Retailer since 1987.

TSR's newly hired Scott Haring added four pages of purely game material to a series of "comic modules" published by TSR West, since TSR had an exclusive license for comic books with DC. Haring identifies Empires of the Sands (1988) as his first big project at TSR. He has also written and edited for the Top Secret/S.I. and Marvel Super Heroes role-playing games. His other D&D design work includes The Republic of Darokin (1989) and Otherlands (1990).

Haring was also the editor for The Gamer magazine. He lives in central Texas with his wife and stepson.

References

External links
 

Dungeons & Dragons game designers
GURPS writers
Living people
Place of birth missing (living people)
Year of birth missing (living people)